Ninghua railway station is a railway station in Ninghua County, Sanming, Fujian, China. It is an intermediate stop on both the Xingguo–Quanzhou railway and the Pucheng–Meizhou railway.

References 

Railway stations in Fujian
Railway stations in China opened in 2021